Lactuca quercina is a species of wild lettuce native to Europe and Asia.

Lactuca quercina contains lactucarium, which is the milky sap (white latex) that flows through the stem, leaves, and roots of the plant. It is used as a medicinal herb when dried after contact with air. It may be used as medicinal treatments for its anodyne, antispasmodic, digestive, diuretic, hypnotic, narcotic, and sedative properties. Concentrations of lactucarium are low in young plants, but increase in older plants, occurring highest when in blooming period. Sap may be applied to skin in use for treatment of external warts. Although the standard definition of lactucarium requires its production from Lactuca virosa, it was recognized that smaller quantities of lactucarium could be produced in a similar way from Lactuca sativa and Lactuca canadensis var. elongata, and even that lettuce-opium obtained from Lactuca serriola or Lactuca quercina was of superior quality.

References

External links
Photo of L. quercina in bloom at Centre for Genetic Resources, the Netherlands in 2016

quercina
Plants described in 1753
Taxa named by Carl Linnaeus